Hyland Software is the developer of the enterprise content management (ECM) and process management software suite called OnBase. Applications of the suite are used in  healthcare, financial institutions, insurance, government, higher education and manufacturing. The firm has its headquarters in Westlake, Ohio, and offices in Lincoln, Nebraska; Irvine, California; Charlotte, North Carolina; São Paulo, Brazil; London, England; Tokyo, Japan; Andover, Massachusetts; Melbourne, Australia; Kolkata, India; Sydney, Australia; Berlin, Germany; Olathe, Kansas; Bloomington, Minnesota; Salt Lake City, Utah; Phoenix, Arizona; and Tampa, Florida.

Corporate history

Founding
The company was founded in 1991 by Packy Hyland Jr. He met with members of the Necedah Bank to discuss its data processing and how electronic information technology could reduce printing costs by storing daily reports directly to optical disks. Packy Hyland created the first version of OnBase for the Necedah Bank, which became Hyland Software's first customer. Because OnBase was created for a bank, a majority of Hyland Software's customers were in the banking industry until recently when the healthcare providers found value from ECM technologies.

Acquisition history
September 1, 2006: Matrix Imaging, a private enterprise content management company in Bloomfield Hills, Michigan specializing in the higher education sector

July 1, 2008: Liberty Information Management Systems (IMS), a private Costa Mesa, California-based enterprise content management company.

Hyland acquired the company to gain a larger customer and partner base. The office in California, with a move from Costa Mesa to Irvine, has been maintained.

July 1, 2009: Valco Data Systems, a private, Salem, New Hampshire-based healthcare software and software integration company Valco's software was noted for being strongly integrated with software from MEDITECH.
March 1, 2010: eHealth, a private, Reading, Massachusetts-based provider of hosted medical records workflow  Their specific expertise is in the areas of coding and revenue cycle workflow.

March 1, 2010: eWebHealth, a private, Reading, Massachusetts-based provider of hosted medical records workflow  Their specific expertise is in the areas of coding and revenue cycle workflow.

September 1, 2010: Hershey Systems, a private, Santa Fe Springs, California maker of Singularity, a document management system marketed to higher education institutions 
September 24, 2010: Computer Systems Company, Inc. (dba The CSC Group), a private, Strongsville, Ohio-based provider of healthcare software and document conversion services 

September 24, 2010: Computer Systems Company, Inc. (dba The CSC Group), a private, Strongsville, Ohio-based provider of healthcare software and document conversion services 

August 29, 2012: SIRE Technologies, Inc., a private, Salt Lake City, Utah-based software developer focused on stuff for county and local governments
December 2012: Enterprise Consulting Partners (ECP), a private, Reston, VA-based software focused on workflow automation and document management solutions that support business processes  invoice automation, billing, contract management, purchase requisitioning and Human Resources.

December 2012: Enterprise Consulting Partners (ECP), a private, Reston, VA-based software focused on workflow automation and document management solutions that support business processes invoice automation, billing, contract management, purchase requisitioning and Human Resources.

February 28, 2013: AnyDoc Software, a Tampa, Florida-based software developer focused on automated document, data capture and classification
June 1, 2014: CALYX, a private, Belrose, Australia-based software company

June 1, 2014: CALYX, a private, Belrose, Australia-based software company

October 13, 2015: LawLogix, a Phoenix, Arizona-based software company specializing in cloud-based immigration and compliance software
May 2016: MicroSoft ECM, a private, Indianapolis, IN- based software company

May 2016: MicroSoft ECM, a private, Indianapolis, IN- based software company

July 7, 2017: the Perceptive business unit from Lexmark International, Inc. including the products Perceptive Content (formerly ImageNow), Perceptive Capture (formerly Brainware), Acuo VNA, PACSGEAR, Clarion, Nolij, Superion, Pallas Athena, ISYS and Twisting

October 22, 2020: Hyland announced the acquisition of Alfresco Software

April 8, 2021: Hyland announced the acquisition of Nuxeo.

Major industries

- Healthcare
- Government
- Higher Education 
- Commercial
- Financial Services
- Insurance
- Manufacturing

Key people

Packy Hyland, Jr. is the founder of Hyland Software and developed the first version of OnBase for The Necedah Bank in Wisconsin in 1991. Miguel Zubizarreta served as CTO and joined the company in 1992 and has since retired in 2016, and was responsible for the architecture and product development direction of the OnBase product line. Chris Hyland served as CFO and joined the company in 1992 and will retire on 2020.

Product

Hyland Software's OnBase product integrates document management, business process automation and records management. Industry analysts such as Forrester Research focus on the product's foundational ECM functionality, like imaging and archiving capabilities, as its strengths.

The OnBase product also offers integrations with Microsoft, SAP, Oracle Corporation and Lawson to gain more value from existing technologies OnBase is written in .NET, JavaScript. OnBase was named 2015 Best in KLAS for Document Management and Imaging.

Services

The OnBase Cloud

Hyland offers a Software-as-a-Service (SaaS) application of OnBase software known as the OnBase Cloud. This service is a cloud-based version of Hyland's traditional OnBase product offering; applications are hosted at a data center and accessed over a secure Internet connection.

Alfresco Cloud

Hyland offers a Platform as a service (PaaS) cloud-hosted platform of Alfresco Content Services, with customisation via Alfresco Module Packages (AMPs) and Alfresco Developer Framework (ADF) applications.

Nuxeo Cloud 
Hyland offers a Platform as a service (PaaS) cloud-hosted platform of Nuxeo Content Services, configuration can be done using Nuxeo Studio.

Nuxeo Studio 
Nuxeo Studio is offered as a Software-as-a-Service (SaaS) application for configuration and customisation of Nuxeo Platform.

Recognition
In 2014, 2015, and 2016 the company was ranked as one of Fortune's 100 Best Companies to Work For list, rising to position 48 in 2016.

Hyland has, however, been the subject of a corruption probe in relation to the sale of its technology to the local government of Cuyahoga County, Ohio.  Notably, the company improperly received a $1.2 million contract from the county, which ultimately resulted in the indictment of a public official on numerous charges.

References

External links

 Hyland, creator of OnBase official website
 ECM 101 Research Guide
 Gartner Magic Quadrant Update, Document Imaging Talk, November 22, 2010

Content management systems
Document management systems
Software companies based in Ohio
Companies based in Cleveland
Software companies established in 1991
1991 establishments in Ohio
Records management technology
Software companies of the United States
2007 mergers and acquisitions